Dial Records was a Nashville-based soul label established by music promoter, publisher and producer Buddy Killen in 1961.

History
Dial Records was formed specifically so Buddy Killen could record perhaps his best-known discovery, soul singer Joe Tex. After a few tries and misses, Tex came up with a song called "Hold What You've Got",  a 1964 ballad that bridged traditional rhythm and blues with the emerging Southern soul style and also pointed toward a future of rap thanks to Tex's spoken, almost testifying homily midway through the song. (Tex, in fact, was actually nicknamed "The Rapper" in these years.") "Hold What You've Got" got Killen's Dial label a distribution deal with Atlantic Records. Joe Tex was the anchor star of this Dial label (he rolled up almost thirty soul hits, some of which hit the pop charts, especially "Skinny Legs and All" and "I Gotcha") until he all but retired from music in the 1970s and died of a heart attack at age 49.

Dial had a few distributors over the years including London Records, Atlantic Records, Mercury Records, Epic Records and T.K. Records.  Killen shut down the label in 1979 to concentrate on his other music interests.  He owned Tree International Publishing.

Sony/ATV Music Publishing owns the Dial Records catalogue today.

Artists
 Joe Tex
 Bobby Marchan
 Clarence Reid
 Paul Kelly
 Chris Harris & The Soul Agents
 Clarence "Frogman" Henry
 Gunilla Hutton
 Frederick Knight
 Annette Snell
 King Floyd
 Jean Knight
 Little Archie
 Len Wade
 Wayne Handy
 The Allman Joys

Label variations
Dial Records had the distinction of going through four different distributors:
 London-distributed label (early-1960s, numbered in the 3000s): black and red label, large logo at top
 Atlantic-distributed label (mid-to-late-1960s, 4000s): same label as above
 Mercury-distributed label (early-1970s, 1000s): yellow and orange label, smaller logo at top
 TK-distributed label (late-1970s, 2800s): yellow, blue and green label, small logo at top

See also
 List of record labels

References

American record labels
Soul music record labels
Record labels established in 1964